The Heinkel HE 8 was a reconnaissance floatplane built in Germany in the late 1920s. It was developed at the request of the Danish Navy, which had noted the success of the HE 5 in Swedish service, and wished to purchase a similar aircraft as well as licensed production as the Orlogsvaerftet HM.II. Apart from its new Armstrong Siddeley engine, the HE 8 also differed from the HE 5 and previous members of the HE 1 family in having a conventional empennage. 22 aircraft were operated until the German invasion in 1940, after which one example was impressed into Luftwaffe service and the remainder placed in storage.

A single HE 8 was built with a Packard 3A-2500 engine and designated HE 31.

Operators

Royal Danish Navy

Royal Yugoslav Navy (One)

Specifications (HM.II)

See also

References

Bibliography

Further reading

External links

 Danish Naval Air Service

HE 008
1920s German military reconnaissance aircraft
Floatplanes
Low-wing aircraft
Single-engined tractor aircraft
Aircraft first flown in 1927